The Chinese sparrowhawk (Accipiter soloensis) is a bird of prey in the family Accipitridae.

Distribution and habitat 
It breeds in Southeast China, Taiwan, Korea and Siberia; winters in Indonesia and Philippines, passing through the rest of Southeast Asia. It lives mainly in forests but sometimes lives on edges.

Description
It is 30–36 cm in length, with the female larger than the male. Adults have prominent black wing tips. The male is grey above, white below and has red eyes. The female has rufous on breast and underwing coverts, and yellow eyes. Juveniles have a grey face, brown upperparts and yellow eyes. The top underparts are streaked, while the thighs are barred. The black wing tips are not as prominent and underwings streaked (except for coverts).

Diet 
In its breeding range, it feeds mainly on frogs, but will take lizards and other small invertebrates as well. In its wintering range, this species feeds heavily on cicadas.

References

Chinese sparrowhawk
Chinese sparrowhawk
Birds of prey of Asia
Birds of China
Birds of Hong Kong
Birds of Manchuria
Chinese sparrowhawk